São Bento do Sapucaí is a Brazilian municipality in São Paulo state.

Once known as a religious and traditional town, the municipality of São Bento do Sapucaí, now with its population reaching 10,000 inhabitants, is known for its mild weather, beautiful landscapes, and great conditions for the practice of many action sports.

History
First settlings in that area were made by Bandeirantes that went up the Serra da Mantiqueira trying to reach the gold mining regions of Minas Gerais. The town was founded on August 6, 1832, and Saint Benedict was chosen as the patron saint.
The name of the place comes from Saint Benedict in Portuguese) and the river Sapucaí, that crosses town.
Around 1850, José Pereira Alves and his wife, Ignez Leite de Toledo donated a large area of land to the town, with the purpose of building a great church in honor of St. Benedict. The town's folk went in a religious procession to retrieve an image of the saint from the nearest chapel (which was almost in Sapucaí-Mirim, Minas Gerais), and then the "Igreja Matriz de São Bento" (St. Benedict's Matrix Church) started to be built by the slaves. Still today, you can find in there paintings of well-known artists that date back to 1853.

Geography

Located 164 km northeast of São Paulo, on a mountain chain called Serra da Mantiqueira, it has a total area of 251.2 km2. The topography is very mountainous. There are many hills and waterfalls (the highest being Toldi Falls with more than 200 m).

The municipality contains 66% of the  Sapucaí Mirim Environmental Protection Area, created in 1998.

References

Municipalities in São Paulo (state)
Populated places established in 1832